This is a list of the 128 members of the National Congress of Honduras that were elected in the 2005 general election.

References

Lists of members of the National Congress of Honduras